Aqda District is in Ardakan County, Yazd province, Iran. At the 2006 National Census, its population was 4,578 in 1,387 households. The following census in 2011 counted 7,159 people in 1,569 households. At the latest census in 2016, the district had 6,716 inhabitants in 1,646 households.

References 

Ardakan County

Districts of Yazd Province

Populated places in Yazd Province

Populated places in Ardakan County